"A Moment Like This" is the debut single by American singer Kelly Clarkson. The song was written by Jörgen Elofsson and John Reid from British house music project Nightcrawlers and produced by Stephen Ferrera and Steve Mac. It was released as a double A-side with "Before Your Love" as her coronation single after winning the first season of American Idol. The song was later included on her debut studio album, Thankful (2003). "A Moment Like This" was a huge hit in North America, topping the US Billboard Hot 100 and Canadian Singles Chart.

In 2006, the song was recorded and released by British singer Leona Lewis, the winner of the third series of The X Factor. Her version was the Christmas number one for 2006, outselling the rest of the top 40 combined. Lewis' version has sold 914,000 copies as of 2015.

Background
The song was co-written by Jörgen Elofsson and John Reid (of dance act Nightcrawlers), produced by Stephen Ferrera and Steve Mac, and mixed by Andy Zulla. It was written to be the first single for the winner of the first season of American Idol. As a result, the four remaining finalists, Kelly Clarkson, Justin Guarini, Nikki McKibbin, and Tamyra Gray each recorded a version of the song in case they won. The song was first revealed to the public when Guarini and Clarkson competed in a final showdown while singing this song, along with another track, "Before Your Love". After the American public had voted, Guarini performed the song (and Clarkson performed "Before Your Love") at the final show before the results were revealed. When Clarkson was announced as the winner, she became emotional, and sang the song as her final performance.

"Before Your Love", was also given to radio and had a video shot, which debuted on MTV's Total Request Live before "A Moment Like This" did; however, it failed to achieve the level of success of "A Moment Like This", but shares the Gold certification as a double-a sided single.

"A Moment Like This/Before Your Love" was certified gold by RIAA on October 18, 2002.  As of June 4, 2009, the single has sold approximately 1,047,000 copies.

On March 5, 2013, Billboard ranked the song number 11 in its list of Top 100 American Idol Hits of All Time.

Composition
The song moves at a tempo of 73 beats per minute in common time. The first two verses are in the key of E flat minor, and the chorus after each verse transitions to A flat major. The final chorus transposes to B flat major. Clarkson's vocals span from A3 to F5.

Critical reception
This song received moderately positive reviews. Entertainment Weekly editor Henry Goldblatt wrote about Clarkson's performance of the song on American Idol: "the woman whose tears during her winning rendition of A Moment Like This were so heartfelt, grown men cried along with her." David Browne, also of Entertainment Weekly, wrote: "A choir at the end of "A Moment Like This" is meant to indicate earthiness." Arion Berger of Rolling Stone wrote that this song "signaled that Kelly might be headed toward the Mariah-Whitney-Celine radio-ballad sausage mill." Sal Cinquemani of Slant Magazine wrote that this song is "Adult Contemporary goo. AllMusic senior editor Stephen Thomas Erlewine wrote that the song "may have been a number one hit, but it was such a staid adult contemporary tune that it suggested that her career was over before it really began, since it was not a work that played to her age or audience, and it gave her no room to grow." He also marked this song as a standout on album Thankful. The Huffington Post ranked the song at number 11 on "The 33 Greatest Pop Divas' Debut Singles" list.

Chart performance
As the first single ever from American Idol, much pressure was put on "A Moment Like This" to perform well. The debut single from Will Young, the winner of the United Kingdom's Pop Idol (the forerunner to American Idol), sold 1.2 million copies in its first week, becoming the fastest-selling British debut single of all time; however, critics argued that the American singles market was different from the British market. The single became a hit in the U.S., debuting at number 60 on the Billboard Hot 100 on September 21, 2002, and reaching number one on its third week on the chart. It sold 236,000 in its first week. It topped the Billboard Hot 100 for two consecutive weeks and remained on the chart for 20 consecutive weeks. Sales of the commercial single also helped the song (as evidenced by its number-one peak on the Hot 100 Singles Sales) break records.

On the Billboard issue dated October 5, 2002, the song topped the Hot 100 chart with a single-week jump of 51 positions, the largest single-week jump to number one on the Hot 100. She held that record until Maroon 5's "Makes Me Wonder" single-week jump 63 positions to number one, on May 12, 2007. Clarkson would break the record again when her song "My Life Would Suck Without You" jumped 96 spots from 97 to 1 on February 7, 2009.

Music video
The music video for "A Moment Like This" was directed by Antti J. It has Clarkson exploring a vacant theatre, where she takes the stage to sing and perform the song. Clips of her singing on American Idol and getting emotional when she won the competition are also shown.

Track listing

Charts

Weekly charts

Year-end charts

Certifications

Release history

Leona Lewis version

Release
In December 2006, British singer Leona Lewis, who went on to win the third series of The X Factor, covered "A Moment Like This" as her debut single. Lewis was chosen as the winner on the night of December 16, when the live finale aired. The cover was made available for digital download the following day. The physical single was rush-released on Wednesday, December 20–which was unusual as most new singles were released on Mondays to gain maximum amount of sales for the UK Singles Chart the following Sunday–due to Lewis being crowned only four days prior.

Accolades
In January 2007, "A Moment Like This" was shortlisted for the British Single award at the 2007 Brit Awards. It made it to the second round but was eliminated and did not make it to the final selection. In May, it won the Ivor Novello Award for Best-Selling British Single.

Commercial performance
Lewis' version of "A Moment Like This" broke a world record after it was downloaded 50,000 times within just 30 minutes of release. It sold over 101,000 copies on its first day on sale, setting the record for the fastest-selling The X Factor winner's single. The song debuted atop the UK Singles Chart dated December 30, thus becoming the Christmas number one for 2006, and spent three additional weeks at the summit. It went on to become the most downloaded song and the second best-selling single of 2006 in the United Kingdom.

"A Moment Like This" peaked atop the Irish Singles Chart, staying at the summit for six weeks. On January 4, 2007, it peaked at number three on the European Hot 100 Singles. The single was certified platinum by the British Phonographic Industry (BPI) on January 5. After the release of Lewis's second single "Bleeding Love", "A Moment Like This" re-entered the UK Singles Chart at number 55 on October 28. According to the Official Charts Company (OCC), the single has sold 943,000 copies in the UK as of December 2015.

Music video
The accompanying music video for "A Moment Like This" was directed by JT. Like Clarkson's, it's simple, featuring Lewis singing the song on a stage. It also features several clips from Lewis' time on The X Factor, from her first audition to the moment she was announced as the winner. Simon Cowell, Sharon Osbourne, Louis Walsh, Kate Thornton and Ray Quinn are all featured within The X Factor clips.

Track listings and formats

Charts

Weekly charts

Year-end charts

Certifications

|}

Release history

Notes

References

 

2002 songs
2002 singles
Kelly Clarkson songs
2006 debut singles
Leona Lewis songs
Billboard Hot 100 number-one singles
Canadian Singles Chart number-one singles
Number-one singles in Scotland
UK Singles Chart number-one singles
Irish Singles Chart number-one singles
American Idol songs
The X Factor (British TV series)
Pop ballads
Songs written by Jörgen Elofsson
Song recordings produced by Steve Mac
RCA Records singles
19 Recordings singles
Syco Music singles
Sony BMG singles
2000s ballads
Christmas number-one singles in the United Kingdom